The International Council of Organizations of Folklore Festivals and Folk Arts (CIOFF) is an international nongovernmental organization (NGO) in Official Partnership with UNESCO and is accredited to provide advisory service to the Committee of the UNESCO Convention for the Safeguarding of Intangible Cultural Heritage. CIOFF has 63 full members, 21 associate members and 18 corresponding members worldwide and 3 partner members. Its headquarters are in Confolens in France. Full members are National Sections with the aim to preserve traditional art, to organize Folklore Festivals or similar activities as well as unite voluntary organizations, working in the field of dance, music, costumes, customs and ethnography. The National Sections belong to sectors in the organization according to their geographic location. CIOFF is a member of the International Music Council.

Aims 
Aims of the organization are the preservation, promotion, and dissemination of traditional art and Folklore.

Events 
Each year more than 350 Folklore Festivals organized by CIOFF take place worldwide  Every 4 years CIOFF world organization is holding Folkloriada. This is a major festival where all members of CIOFF are invited to send Folklore Groups from their countries to show the diversity of Folklore. CIOFF has organized 5 Folkloriadas.  The 2020 Folkloriada is scheduled for July 18 - Aug 1 in the Republic of Bashkortostan, Russia.

2008 Folkloriada had to be cancelled because of a natural disaster in China.

Culture 
Two very important aims of CIOFF are to disseminate the ideas of the (Convention on the Protection and Promotion of the Diversity of Cultural Expressions and to collaborate on the implementation of the Convention for the Safeguarding of the Intangible Cultural Heritage of the UNESCO.

Formation 
The organization was founded on August 8, 1970 in Confolence in France by Henri Coursaget und 9 other people.

On July 11, 1984 CIOFF was given the category of mutual informal Relations to UNESCO (Status C). From then on CIOFF became a member of the members of the International Nongovernmental Organizations of UNESCO. In September 1990 CIOFF was upgraded to the category Formal Consultative Relations with UNESCO (Status B).

Presidents 
 Henri Coursaget, France (1970–1989)
 Guy Landry, Canada (1989–1997)
 Kari Bergholm, Finland (1997–2005)
 Dr. Udomsak Sakmunwong, Thailand (2005–2013)
 Philippe Beaussant, France (2013–03/2022 )
 Norbert Müller, Germany (03/2022-09/2022)
 Dr. Alejandro Camacho Gonzalez, Mexico (09/2022-)

Organizational structure

General Assembly 
The General Assembly (GA) is the highest organ of CIOFF. It takes place every year in one of the member countries. It is the decision-making unit, because determines of the targets and the formal guidelines of the organization’s work and makes decisions on proposals presented by the council. The GA also elects the members of the Council for a period of 4 years. The council meets twice a year.

General Secretariat 
The General Secretariat has its headquarters in Stockton on Tees in United Kingdom and is overseen by the Secretary General.

Commissions 
For the development of basic themes in the comprehensive field of activities of CIOFF and for advising the council and the general Assembly permanent Commissions are established. These are the Festivals Commission, the Legal Commission and the Cultural Commission.

Working groups 
To solve temporary problems or to do work on specific projects working groups can be established.

Management bodies 
The management bodies of CIOFF are the Executive Committee (EXCO), consisting of the President, two Vice Presidents, the Treasurer and the Secretary General and the Council consisting of the EXCO, the Chairmen of the Commissions, the Representatives of the Sectors, the Representative to UNESCO and the Chairman of the Youth Coordinating Committee.

Members 

Asian and Oceania Sector: Australia, China, Chinese Taipei, India, Indonesia, Kyrgyzstan, Japan, Jordan, Rep. of Korea, Kuwait, Malaysia, New Zealand, Philippines, Saudi Arabia, Sri Lanka, Syria, Tahiti, Thailand, Turkey, United Arab Emirates (UAE), Uzbekistan. 

Central European Sector: Armenia,  Austria, Azerbaijan, Belarus, Belgium, Czech Republic, Georgia, Germany, Hungary, Israel, Luxembourg, Netherlands, Poland, Romania, Russia, Slovenia, Ukraine.

Latin American Sector: Argentina, Brazil, Brazil Abrasoffa, Chile, Colombia, Costa Rica, Cuba, Ecuador, El Salvador, Guatemala, Haiti, Honduras, Mexico, Panama,  Paraguay, Peru, Venezuela

North American Sector: Antigua and Barbuda, Belize, Canada, Trinidad and Tobago, United States of America

North European Sector: Ireland, Estonia, Finland, Latvia, Lithuania, Norway, Sweden, United Kingdom

South European and African Sector: Albania, Algeria, Benin, Bulgaria, Congo RDC, Bosnia-Herzegovina, Burkina-Faso, Cameroon, Central Africa, Croatia, Cyprus, Iskele and Goenyeli Festivals, Egypt, France, Gabon, Gambia, Greece, Guinea, Italy, Ivory Coast, Macedonia, Mali, Mauritania, Morocco, Montenegro, Niger, Portugal, Senegal, Spain, Serbia, South-Afrika, Switzerland, Togo, Tunisia

References

External links 
 CIOFF-World organization
 NGO at UNESCO
 CIOFF World Folkloriada 2012 in Korea

Folk art
International cultural organizations
International nongovernmental organizations